Pseudaletis agrippina, the Agrippina's fantasy, is a butterfly in the family Lycaenidae. The species was first described by Hamilton Herbert Druce in 1888. It is found in Ivory Coast, Ghana, Togo, Nigeria, Cameroon, Angola, the Central African Republic, the Democratic Republic of the Congo, Sudan, Uganda and Tanzania. Its habitat consists of forests.

Adults mimic day-flying moths of the genus Scopula.

Subspecies
Pseudaletis agrippina agrippina (Ghana: Volta Region, Togo, Nigeria: south and the Cross River loop, Cameroon, Angola, Central African Republic, Democratic Republic of the Congo, southern Sudan, Uganda, north-western Tanzania)
Pseudaletis agrippina warrengashi Libert, 2007 (Ivory Coast) (named in honour of Haydon Warren-Gash)

References

External links
Die Gross-Schmetterlinge der Erde 13: Die Afrikanischen Tagfalter. Plate XIII 66 h

Butterflies described in 1888
Pseudaletis
Butterflies of Africa
Taxa named by Hamilton Herbert Druce